Robin Jefferson (born 18 August 1941) is a New Zealand former cricketer. He played first-class cricket for Otago and Wellington between 1965 and 1970.

See also
 List of Otago representative cricketers

References

External links
 

1941 births
Living people
New Zealand cricketers
Otago cricketers
Wellington cricketers
Cricketers from Christchurch